Bardhaman Uttar Assembly constituency is an assembly constituency in Purba Bardhaman district in the Indian state of West Bengal. It is reserved for scheduled castes.

Overview
As per order of the Delimitation Commission, No. 266 Bardhaman Uttar Assembly constituency (SC) covers Burdwan II community development block and Belkash, Bandul I, Rayan I, Rayan II, Saraitikar, Baghar I and Baghar II gram panchayats of Burdwan I community development block.

Bardhaman Uttar assembly segments is part of No. 39 Bardhaman-Durgapur (Lok Sabha constituency).

Members of Legislative Assembly

Election results

2021

2016

2011

 

.# Swing calculated on Congress+Trinamool Congress vote percentages taken together, as well as the CPI(M) vote percentage, in 2006 for the Bardhaman Uttar constituency.

1967-2006
Pradip Tah of CPI (M) won the Bardhaman Uttar seat defeating his nearest rival Deb Narayan Guha of Trinamool Congress in the 2006 assembly elections. Contests in most years were multi cornered but only winners and runners are being mentioned. In 2001 and 1996, Nisith Adhikary of CPI (M) defeated Lakshmi Narayan Nayek and Raimoni Das (both of  Congress) in the respective years. In 1991 and 1987, Benoy Krishna Chowdhury of CPI (M) defeated Sadhan Ghosh and Santosh Saha Sikdar (both of  Congress) in the respective years. In 1982, Goswami Ramnarayan of CPI (M) defeated Lakshmi Narayan Rej of ICS. In 1977, Dwarka Nath Tah of CPI (M) won the seat defeating Sudhir Chandra Dawn of Congress. Kashinath Ta of  Congress won the seat in 1972. Debabrata Dutta of CPI (M) won the seat in 1971 and 1969. Sahedullah of CPI (M) won the seat in 1967.

1951-1962
Radharani Mahtab of Congress won the Bardhaman seat in 1962. Benoy Choudhuri representing CPI won the seat in 1957 and 1951.

References

Politics of Paschim Bardhaman district
Assembly constituencies of West Bengal
Politics of Purba Bardhaman district